Persephona is a genus of true crabs in the family Leucosiidae. There are about 5 described species in Persephona.

Species
 Persephona aquilonaris 
 Persephona crinita M. J. Rathbun, 1931
 Persephona mediterranea (J. F. W. Herbst, 1794) (mottled purse crab)
 Persephona punctata 
 Persephona subovata

References

 Melo, Gustavo A. S., Maria Fernanda A. Torres, and Oswaldo Campos Jr. / Paolo S. Young, ed. (1998). "Malacostraca - Eucarida, Brachyura, Dromiacea and Oxystomata". Catalogue of Crustacea of Brazil, Série Livros no. 6, 439-454.

External links

 NCBI Taxonomy Browser, Persephona

Decapods